is a Japanese football player for Ehime FC.

Club statistics
Updated to 23 February 2018.

References

External links
Profile at Ehime FC

1986 births
Living people
Hannan University alumni
Association football people from Kagoshima Prefecture
Japanese footballers
J2 League players
Yokohama FC players
Avispa Fukuoka players
Ehime FC players
Association football forwards